Klippel is a German surname. Notable people with the surname include:

Maurice Klippel (1858–1942), French physician
Klippel–Feil syndrome
Klippel–Trénaunay–Weber syndrome
Robert Klippel (1920–2001), Australian constructivist sculptor and teacher
Christoph Klippel (born 1986), German footballer

German-language surnames